The second season of Hawaii Five-O, an American television series, began September 24, 1969, and ended on March 11, 1970. It aired on CBS. The region 1 DVD was released on July 31, 2007, with the episode "Bored, She Hung Herself" excluded.

Episodes

References

External links 
 
 

1969 American television seasons
1970 American television seasons
02